The 2010–11 Liechtenstein Cup was the sixty-sixth season of Liechtenstein's annual cup competition. Seven clubs competed with a total of seventeen teams for one spot in the second qualifying round of the UEFA Europa League. Defending champions were Vaduz, who had won the cup continuously since 1998 and won their 39th Liechtenstein Cup the previous season.

First round
The First Round featured ten teams. In this round nine of the reserve clubs participating in the competition entered, along with Triesen. These matches took place on 17 and 18 August 2010.

|colspan="3" style="background-color:#99CCCC"|

|-
|colspan="3" style="background-color:#99CCCC"|

|}

Second round
The five winners of the First Round, along with FC Schaan, FC Triesenberg and FC Ruggell competed in the Second Round. The games were played on 14 and 15 September 2010.

|colspan="3" style="background-color:#99CCCC"|

|-
|colspan="3" style="background-color:#99CCCC"|

|}

Quarterfinals
The four winners of the Second Round reached the Quarterfinals, along with the semifinalists from the previous season's competitions: FC Vaduz, USV Eschen/Mauren, FC Balzers and USV Eschen/Mauren II.

|colspan="3" style="background-color:#99CCCC"|

|-
|colspan="3" style="background-color:#99CCCC"|

|}

Semifinals
The four winners of the Quarterfinals competed in the Semifinals.

|colspan="3" style="background-color:#99CCCC"|

|-
|colspan="3" style="background-color:#99CCCC"|

|}

Final
The final was played in the national stadium, the Rheinpark Stadion.

References

External links
 Official site 
 RSSSF

Liechtenstein Football Cup seasons
Liechtenstein Cup
2010–11 in Liechtenstein football